This article provides two lists:
A list of National Basketball Association players by total career regular season steals.
A progressive list of steals leaders showing how the record has increased through the years.

Steals leaders
This is a list of National Basketball Association players by total career regular season leaders in steals.
Statistics accurate as of March 16, 2023.

Progressive list of steals leaders
This is a progressive list of steals leaders showing how the record increased through the years.
Statistics accurate as of March 16, 2023.

See also
Basketball statistics
NBA regular season records

Notes

References

External links
Basketball-Reference.com enumeration of NBA career leaders in steals
National Basketball Association official website enumeration of NBA career leaders in steals

National Basketball Association lists
National Basketball Association statistical leaders